Protein-S-isoprenylcysteine O-methyltransferase is an enzyme that in humans is encoded by the ICMT gene.

This gene encodes the third of three enzymes that posttranslationally modify isoprenylated C-terminal cysteine residues in certain proteins and target those proteins to the cell membrane. This enzyme localizes to the endoplasmic reticulum. Alternative splicing may result in other transcript variants, but the biological validity of those transcripts has not been determined.

References

Further reading